Ululodes mexicanus is a species of owlfly in the tribe Ululodini. It is found in Central America.

References

Further reading

External links

 

Myrmeleontidae
Articles created by Qbugbot
Insects described in 1871